The Kōmeitō, also known as the Kōmei Party and Clean Government Party (CGP), was a political party in Japan, initiated by Daisaku Ikeda, and described by various authors as the "political arm" of Soka Gakkai.

Kōmeitō was considered a centre to centre-left political party of the progressive camp until the 1990s. However, since the 1990s, Kōmeitō has become politically closer to the right-wing LDP and has become a centre to centre-right conservative party.

History
The party was established in January 1962 as the Kōmei Seiji Renmei (Clean Government League) by the Sōka Gakkai, an organization that promoted Nichiren Buddhism. Running as independents, three members of the Sōka Gakkai had been elected to the House of Councillors in the 1956 elections, with the 1959 elections seeing nine members elected. It also had several members elected to local assemblies.

In 1957, a group of Young Men's Division members campaigning for a Gakkai candidate in an Osaka House of Councillors by-election were arrested for distributing money, cigarettes, and caramels at supporters' residences, in violation of elections law, and on July 3 of that year, at the beginning of an event memorialized as the "Osaka Incident," Daisaku Ikeda was arrested in Osaka. He was taken into custody in his capacity as Sōka Gakkai's Youth Division Chief of Staff for overseeing activities that constituted violations of elections law. He spent two weeks in jail and appeared in court forty-eight times before he was cleared of all charges in January 1962.

Amongst its policies, the new party supported the 1947 constitution and opposed nuclear weapons. Headed by Harashima Kōji. In the July 1962 elections the new party won nine seats in the House of Councillors.

On 17 November 1964 the party was renamed Kōmeitō. In 1968, fourteen of its members were convicted of forging absentee ballots in Shinjuku, and eight were sentenced to prison for electoral fraud. In the 1960s it was widely criticized for violating the separation of church and state, and in February 1970 all three major Japanese newspapers printed editorials demanding that the party reorganize. It eventually broke apart based on promises to segregate from Soka Gakkai.

In 1969, the Kōmeitō became the third political party in Japan.

In the 1980s Akahata discovered that many Soka Gakkai members were rewarding acquaintances with presents in return for Komeito votes, and that Okinawa residents had changed their addresses to elect Komeito politicians. It was also revealed that while the party was technically separate from the Soka Gakkai, monetary donations made that were tax exempt were being funneled into funding for the Kōmeitō party as revealed by an expelled Kōmeitō member of the Tokyo municipal assembly.

It was usually supportive of the Japan Socialist Party, and opposed the LDP (Liberal Democratic Party), the major ruling party at that time.

Kōmeitō did quite well, and in 1993, when the LDP was for the first time declared an opposition party, the Kōmeitō became one of the ruling parties, headed by the liberal Japan New Party, but which also included the Democratic Socialist Party, Japan Renewal Party, the New Party Sakigake, and the Japan Socialist Party. In 1994, the latter two parties left the coalition, and in July they took over the rule, making another coalition with the LDP. The Kōmeitō was again thrown into opposition.

On December 5, 1994, The Kōmeitō split into two parties. The Lower House chairs and some of Upper House chairs formed Kōmeitō New Party, and five days later, they joined into the New Frontier Party. The others, i.e. local assembly members and the rest of the Upper House chairs, formed Kōmei and independent friend of the New Frontier Party.

In 1998, however, the New Frontier Party dissolved, and former Kōmeitō members formed New Peace Party and Reform Club. They merged with Kōmei in the same year and then became known as the NKP (New Kōmeitō Party). The NKP adopted a more conservative agenda than the former Kōmeitō and in 1999 they supported the ruling party, the LDP.

See also
Japan Socialist Party
Liberal Democratic Party (Japan)
Komeito
Politics of Japan
Reformist party (Japan) (Before 1990s)
Social Democratic Party (Japan)
Sōka Gakkai

References

Soka Gakkai
Buddhism in Japan
Buddhist democratic parties
Centrist parties in Japan
Conservative parties in Japan
Defunct political parties in Japan
Economic progressivism
Political parties established in 1962
Political parties disestablished in 1998
Progressive parties in Japan
1962 establishments in Japan
1998 disestablishments in Japan

ja:公明党